Chignolo d'Isola is a comune (municipality) in the Province of Bergamo in the Italian region of Lombardy, located about  northeast of Milan and about  southwest of Bergamo.

Chignolo d'Isola borders the following municipalities: Bonate Sopra, Bonate Sotto, Bottanuco, Madone, Medolago, Suisio, Terno d'Isola.

In the territory of Chignolo d'Isola on 26 February 2010 the body of Yara Gambirasio was found.

Demographic evolution

References